Ji-seong, also spelled Chi-song or Ji-sung, is a Korean unisex given name. The meaning differs based on the hanja used to write each syllable of the name. There are 61 hanja with the reading "ji" and 27 hanja with the reading "seong" on the South Korean government's official list of hanja which may be used in given names.

People with this name include:
Kim Ji-sung (footballer) (1924–1982), South Korean footballer
Ji Sung (born Kwak Tae-geun, 1977), South Korean actor
Park Ji-sung (born 1981), South Korean male footballer
Yoon Ji-sung (born 1991), South Korean singer and actor
Nam Ji-sung (born 1993), South Korean male tennis player
Kim Ji-sung (actress) (born 1996), South Korean actress

See also 
 List of Korean given names

References 

Korean unisex given names